Huguette Gaulin Bergeron (1944 – June 6, 1972), was a French Canadian novelist, who committed suicide publicly by self-immolation in a major street of the Old Port of Montreal, Place Jacques-Cartier, while screaming "Vous avez détruit la beauté du monde!" ("You have destroyed the beauty of the world!").

Luc Plamondon, a French-Canadian lyricist, was inspired to write a hymn in Huguette Gaulin Bergeron's honour, with music by Christian Saint-Roch. The hymn, entitled Hymne à la beauté du monde, has since been sung by numerous French-Canadian artists such as Diane Dufresne, Isabelle Boulay, Garou, and Éric Lapointe.

Works 
 Lecture En Velocipede, 1972

External links

References 

Suicides by self-immolation
1944 births
1972 suicides
Suicides in Quebec
20th-century French novelists
20th-century French women writers